Gilhooley Tower is a basalt spire in the Olympic Mountains and is located in Jefferson County of Washington state. It is situated in Olympic National Park on the Olympic Peninsula. Precipitation runoff drains into tributaries of the Dungeness River and Dosewallips River.

Climate
Gilhooley Tower is located in the marine west coast climate zone of western North America. Most weather fronts originate in the Pacific Ocean, and travel northeast toward the Olympic Mountains. As fronts approach, they are forced upward by the peaks of the Olympic Range, causing them to drop their moisture in the form of rain or snowfall (Orographic lift). As a result, the Olympics experience high precipitation, especially during the winter months in the form of snowfall. During winter months, weather is usually cloudy, but, due to high pressure systems over the Pacific Ocean that intensify during summer months, there is often little or no cloud cover during the summer. Because of maritime influence, snow tends to be wet and heavy, resulting in high avalanche danger.

Gallery

References

External links
 
 Gilhooley Tower weather: Mountain Forecast

Olympic Mountains
Landforms of Jefferson County, Washington
Landforms of Olympic National Park